Hoseynabad (also Romanized as Ḩoseynābād; also known as Ḩoseynābād-e Āli-e Hāshemī) is a village in Golmakan Rural District, Golbajar District, Chenaran County, Razavi Khorasan Province, Iran. At the 2006 census, its population was 78, in 18 families.

References 

Populated places in Chenaran County